Fire Station No. 2, and variations, may refer to:

Alpine Hose Company No. 2, Georgetown, Colorado, listed on the National Register of Historic Places (NRHP)
Hose House No. 2 (Idaho Springs, Colorado), NRHP-listed
Fire Station No. 2 (Miami, Florida), NRHP-listed
Fire Station No. 2, Athens, Georgia, included in NRHP-listed Cobbham Historic District
Fire Station No. 2 (Waterloo, Iowa), NRHP-listed
Fire Station No. 2 (Topeka, Kansas), NRHP-listed
Falls Fire Station No. 2, North Attleborough, Massachusetts, NRHP-listed, now the Falls Fire Barn Museum
Fire Department Headquarters; Fire Station No. 2, Kansas City, Missouri, NRHP-listed
Fire House No. 2 (Billings, Montana), NRHP-listed
Fire Station No. 2 (Charlotte, North Carolina), NRHP-listed
Fire Station No. 2 (Tacoma, Washington), NRHP-listed

See also
List of fire stations